This list of museums in South Yorkshire, England contains museums which are defined for this context as institutions (including nonprofit organizations, government entities, and private businesses) that collect and care for objects of cultural, artistic, scientific, or historical interest and make their collections or related exhibits available for public viewing. Also included are non-profit art galleries and university art galleries.  Museums that exist only in cyberspace (i.e., virtual museums) are not included.

Defunct museums
 National Centre for Popular Music, Sheffield, closed in 2000
 York & Lancaster Regiment Museum, Rotherham, closed in 2011, collections now part of the Clifton Park Museum

See also
 :Category:Tourist attractions in South Yorkshire

References

External links

 South Yorkshire Culture, BBC

South Yorkshire
Lists of buildings and structures in South Yorkshire